Anika Lorenz (born 9 December 1990) is a German sailor. She represented Germany, along with partner Victoria Jurczok, in the women's 49er FX class at the 2016 Summer Olympics in Rio de Janeiro. They finished in 9th place.

References

External links 
 
 
 

1990 births
Living people
German female sailors (sport)
Olympic sailors of Germany
Sailors at the 2016 Summer Olympics – 49er FX
49er FX class sailors